The women's shot put at the 2010 African Championships in Athletics was held on August 1.

Results

External links
Results

Shot
Shot put at the African Championships in Athletics
2010 in women's athletics